This is a list of foreign ministers in 2010.

Africa
 Algeria - Mourad Medelci (2007–2013)
 Angola -
 Assunção dos Anjos (2008–2010)
 Georges Rebelo Chicoti (2010–2017)
 Benin - Jean-Marie Ehouzou (2008–2011)
 Botswana - Phandu Skelemani (2008–2014)
 Burkina Faso - Alain Bédouma Yoda (2008–2011)
 Burundi - Augustin Nsanze (2009–2011)
 Cameroon - Henri Eyebe Ayissi (2007–2011)
 Cape Verde - José Brito (2008–2011)
 Central African Republic - Antoine Gambi (2009–2013)
 Chad - Moussa Faki (2008–2017)
 Comoros -
 Ahmed Ben Said Jaffar (2006–2010)
 Fahmi Said Ibrahim El Maceli (2010–2011)
 Republic of Congo - Basile Ikouébé (2007–2015)
 Democratic Republic of Congo - Alexis Thambwe Mwamba (2008–2012)
 Côte d'Ivoire -
 Youssouf Bakayoko (2006–2010)
 Jean-Marie Kacou Gervais (2010–2011) / Alcide Djédjé (2010–2011) (rival government)
 Djibouti - Mahamoud Ali Youssouf (2005–present)
 Egypt - Ahmed Aboul Gheit (2004–2011)
 Equatorial Guinea - Pastor Micha Ondó Bile (2003–2012)
 Eritrea - Osman Saleh Mohammed (2007–present)
 Ethiopia -
 Seyoum Mesfin (1991–2010)
 Hailemariam Desalegn (2010–2012)
 Gabon - Paul Toungui (2008–2012)
 The Gambia -
 Ousman Jammeh (2009–2010)
 Mamadou Tangara (2010–2012)
 Ghana - Muhammad Mumuni (2009–2013)
 Guinea -
 Alexandre Cécé Loua (2009–2010)
 Bakary Fofana (2010)
 Edouard Niankoye Lamah (2010–2012)
 Guinea-Bissau - Adelino Mano Quetá (2009–2011)
 Kenya -
 Moses Wetangula (2008–2012)
 George Saitoti (acting) (2010–2011)
 Lesotho - Mohlabi Tsekoa (2007–2015)
 Liberia -
 Olubanke King-Akerele (2007–2010)
 Toga McIntosh (2010–2012)
 Libya - Moussa Koussa (2009–2011)
 Madagascar -
 Ny Hasina Andriamanjato (2009–2010)
 Hyppolite Ramaroson (2010–2011)
 Malawi - Etta Banda (2009–2011)
 Mali -  Moctar Ouane (2004–2011)
 Mauritania - Naha Mint Mouknass (2009–2011)
 Mauritius - Arvin Boolell (2008–2014)
 Morocco - Taieb Fassi Fihri (2007–2012)
 Western Sahara - Mohamed Salem Ould Salek (1998–2023)
 Mozambique - Oldemiro Balói (2008–2017)
 Namibia -
 Marco Hausiku (2004–2010)
 Utoni Nujoma (2010–2012)
 Niger -
 Aïchatou Mindaoudou (2001–2010)
 Aminatou Maïga Touré (2010–2011)
 Nigeria -
 Ojo Maduekwe (2007–2010)
 Martin Ihoeghian Uhomoibhi (acting) (2010)
 Henry Odein Ajumogobia (2010–2011)
 Rwanda - Louise Mushikiwabo (2009–2018)
 São Tomé and Príncipe -
 Carlos Tiny (2008–2010)
 Manuel Salvador dos Ramos (2010–2012)
 Senegal - Madické Niang (2009–2012)
 Seychelles -
 James Michel (2009–2010)
 Jean-Paul Adam (2010–2015)
 Sierra Leone -
 Zainab Bangura (2007–2010)
 J. B. Dauda (2010–2012)
 Somalia -
 Ali Ahmed Jama Jangali (2009–2010)
 Yusuf Hassan Ibrahim (2010)
 Mohamed Abdullahi Omaar (2010–2012)
 Somaliland -
 Abdillahi Mohamed Duale (2006–2010)
 Abdillahi Mohamed Omer (2010–2013)
 Puntland -
 Farah Adan Dhala (2009–2010)
 Daud Mohamed Omar (2010–2014)
 South Africa - Maite Nkoana-Mashabane (2009–2018)
 Sudan -
 Deng Alor (2007–2010)
 Ali Karti (2010–2015)
 Swaziland - Lutfo Dlamini (2008–2011)
 Tanzania – Bernard Membe (2007–2015)
 Togo -
 Kofi Esaw (2008–2010)
 Elliott Ohin (2010–2013)
 Tunisia -
 Abdelwahab Abdallah (2005–2010)
 Kamel Morjane (2010–2011)
 Uganda - Sam Kutesa (2005–2021)
 Zambia - Kabinga Pande (2007–2011)
 Zimbabwe - Simbarashe Mumbengegwi (2005–2017)

Asia
 Afghanistan -
 Rangin Dadfar Spanta (2006–2010)
 Zalmai Rassoul (2010–2013)
 Armenia - Eduard Nalbandyan (2008–2018)
 Azerbaijan - Elmar Mammadyarov (2004–2020)
 Nagorno-Karabakh - Georgy Petrosyan (2005–2011)
 Bahrain - Sheikh Khalid ibn Ahmad Al Khalifah (2005–2020)
 Bangladesh – Dipu Moni (2009–2013)
 Bhutan - Ugyen Tshering (2008–2013)
 Brunei - Pengiran Muda Mohamed Bolkiah (1984–2015)
 Cambodia - Hor Namhong (1998–2016)
 China - Yang Jiechi (2007–2013)
 East Timor - Zacarias da Costa (2007–2012)
 Georgia - Grigol Vashadze (2008–2012)
 Abkhazia -
 Sergei Shamba (2004–2010)
 Maxim Gvinjia (2010–2011)
 South Ossetia - Murat Dzhioyev (1998–2012)
 India - S. M. Krishna (2009–2012)
 Indonesia - Marty Natalegawa (2009–2014)
 Iran - 
 Manouchehr Mottaki (2005–2010)
 Ali Akbar Salehi (2010–2013)
 Iraq - Hoshyar Zebari (2003–2014)
 Kurdistan - Falah Mustafa Bakir (2006–2019)
 Israel - Avigdor Lieberman (2009–2012)
 Palestinian Authority - Riyad al-Maliki (2007–present)
 Japan -
 Katsuya Okada (2009–2010)
 Seiji Maehara (2010–2011)
 Jordan - Nasser Judeh (2009–2017)
 Kazakhstan – Kanat Saudabayev (2009–2011)
 North Korea - Pak Ui-chun (2007–2014)
 South Korea -
 Yu Myung-hwan (2008–2010)
 Kim Sung-hwan (2010–2013)
 Kuwait - Sheikh Mohammad Sabah Al-Salem Al-Sabah (2003–2011)
 Kyrgyzstan -
 Kadyrbek Sarbayev (2009–2010)
 Ruslan Kazakbayev (2010–2012)
 Laos - Thongloun Sisoulith (2006–2016)
 Lebanon - Ali Al Shami (2009–2011)
 Malaysia - Anifah Aman (2009–2018)
 Maldives - Ahmed Shaheed (2008–2011)
 Mongolia - Gombojavyn Zandanshatar (2009–2012)
 Myanmar - Nyan Win (2004–2011)
 Nepal - Sujata Koirala (2009–2011)
 Oman - Yusuf bin Alawi bin Abdullah (1982–2020)
 Pakistan - Shah Mehmood Qureshi (2008–2011)
 Philippines - Alberto Romulo (2004–2011)
 Qatar - Sheikh Hamad bin Jassim bin Jaber Al Thani (1992–2013)

 Saudi Arabia - Prince Saud bin Faisal bin Abdulaziz Al Saud (1975–2015)
 Singapore - George Yeo (2004–2011)
 Sri Lanka -
 Rohitha Bogollagama (2007–2010)
 G. L. Peiris (2010–2015)
 Syria - Walid Muallem (2006–2020)
 Taiwan - Timothy Yang (2009–2012)
 Tajikistan - Khamrokhon Zaripov (2006–2013)
 Thailand - Kasit Piromya (2008–2011)
 Turkey - Ahmet Davutoğlu (2009–2014)
 Turkmenistan - Raşit Meredow (2001–present)
 United Arab Emirates - Sheikh Abdullah bin Zayed Al Nahyan (2006–present)
 Uzbekistan -
 Vladimir Norov (2006–2010)
 Elyor Ganiyev (2010–2012)
 Vietnam - Phạm Gia Khiêm (2006–2011)
 Yemen - Abu Bakr al-Qirbi (2001–2014)

Europe
 Albania -
 Ilir Meta (2009–2010)
 Edmond Haxhinasto (2010–2012)
 Andorra - Xavier Espot Miró (2009–2011)
 Austria - Michael Spindelegger (2008–2013)
 Belarus - Sergei Martynov (2003–2012)
 Belgium - Steven Vanackere (2009–2011)
 Brussels-Capital Region - Jean-Luc Vanraes (2009–2013)
 Flanders - Kris Peeters (2008–2014)
 Wallonia - Rudy Demotte (2009–2014)
 Bosnia and Herzegovina - Sven Alkalaj (2007–2012)
 Bulgaria -
 Rumiana Jeleva (2009–2010)
 Nickolay Mladenov (2010–2013)
 Croatia - Gordan Jandroković (2008–2011)
 Cyprus - Markos Kyprianou (2008–2011)
 Northern Cyprus - Hüseyin Özgürgün (2009–2013)
 Czech Republic -
 Jan Kohout (2009–2010)
 Karel Schwarzenberg (2010–2013)
 Denmark -
 Per Stig Møller (2001–2010)
 Lene Espersen (2010–2011)
 Greenland - Kuupik Kleist (2009–2013)
 Faroe Islands - Jørgen Niclasen (2008–2011)
 Estonia - Urmas Paet (2005–2014)
 Finland - Alexander Stubb (2008–2011)
 France -
 Bernard Kouchner (2007–2010)
 Michèle Alliot-Marie (2010–2011)
 Germany - Guido Westerwelle (2009–2013)
 Greece -
 George Papandreou (2009–2010)
 Dimitrios Droutsas (2010–2011)
 Hungary -
 Péter Balázs (2009–2010)
 János Martonyi (2010–2014)
 Iceland - Össur Skarphéðinsson (2009–2013)
 Ireland - Micheál Martin (2008–2011)
 Italy - Franco Frattini (2008–2011)
 Latvia -
 Māris Riekstiņš (2007–2010)
 Aivis Ronis (2010)
 Ģirts Valdis Kristovskis (2010–2011)
 Liechtenstein - Aurelia Frick (2009–2019)
 Lithuania -
 Vygaudas Ušackas (2008–2010)
 Rasa Juknevičienė (acting) (2010)
 Audronius Ažubalis (2010–2012)
 Luxembourg - Jean Asselborn (2004–present)
 Macedonia - Antonio Milošoski (2006–2011)
 Malta - Tonio Borg (2008–2012)
 Moldova - Iurie Leancă (2009–2013)
 Transnistria - Vladimir Yastrebchak (2008–2012)
 Monaco - Franck Biancheri (2008–2011)
 Montenegro - Milan Roćen (2006–2012)
 Netherlands -
 Maxime Verhagen (2007–2010)
 Uri Rosenthal (2010–2012)
 Norway - Jonas Gahr Støre (2005–2012)
 Poland - Radosław Sikorski (2007–2014)
 Portugal - Luís Amado (2006–2011)
 Romania - Teodor Baconschi (2009–2012)
 Russia - Sergey Lavrov (2004–present)
 San Marino - Antonella Mularoni (2008–2012)
 Serbia - Vuk Jeremić (2007–2012)
 Kosovo -
 Skënder Hyseni (2008–2010)
 Vlora Çitaku (acting) (2010–2011)
 Slovakia -
 Miroslav Lajčák (2009–2010)
 Mikuláš Dzurinda (2010–2012)
 Slovenia - Samuel Žbogar (2008–2012)
 Spain -
 Miguel Ángel Moratinos (2004–2010)
 Trinidad Jiménez (2010–2011)
 Sweden - Carl Bildt (2006–2014)
 Switzerland - Micheline Calmy-Rey (2003–2011)

 Ukraine -
 Petro Poroshenko (2009–2010)
 Kostyantyn Gryshchenko (2010–2012)
 United Kingdom
David Miliband (2007–2010)
 William Hague (2010–2014)
 Scotland - Fiona Hyslop (2009–2020)
 Vatican City - Archbishop Dominique Mamberti (2006–2014)

North America and the Caribbean
 Antigua and Barbuda - Baldwin Spencer (2005–2014)
 The Bahamas - Brent Symonette (2007–2012)
 Barbados - Maxine McClean (2008–2018)
 Belize - Wilfred Elrington (2008–2020)
 Canada - Lawrence Cannon (2008–2011)
 Quebec -
 Pierre Arcand (2008–2010)
 Monique Gagnon-Tremblay (2010–2012)
 Costa Rica -
 Bruno Stagno Ugarte (2006–2010)
 René Castro (2010–2011)
 Cuba - Bruno Rodríguez Parrilla (2009–present)
 Dominica -
 Vince Henderson (2008–2010)
 Roosevelt Skerrit (2010–2014)
 Dominican Republic - Carlos Morales Troncoso (2004–2014)
 El Salvador - Hugo Martínez (2009–2013)
 Grenada -
 Peter David (2008–2010)
 Karl Hood (2010–2012)
 Guatemala - Haroldo Rodas (2008–2012)
 Haiti - Marie-Michèle Rey (2009–2011)
 Honduras -
 Carlos López Contreras (2009–2010)
 Mario Canahuati (2010–2011)
 Jamaica - Kenneth Baugh (2007–2012)
 Mexico - Patricia Espinosa (2006–2012)
 Netherlands Antilles - Emily de Jongh-Elhage (2006–2010)
 Nicaragua - Samuel Santos López (2007–2017)
 Panama - Juan Carlos Varela (2009–2011)
 Puerto Rico – Kenneth McClintock (2009–2013)
 Saint Kitts and Nevis -
Denzil Douglas (2008–2010)
Sam Condor (2010–2013)
 Saint Lucia - Rufus Bousquet (2009–2011)
 Saint Vincent and the Grenadines -
 Sir Louis Straker (2005–2010)
 Douglas Slater (2010–2013)
 Trinidad and Tobago -
 Paula Gopee-Scoon (2007–2010)
 Surujrattan Rambachan (2010–2012)
 United States of America - Hillary Clinton (2009–2013)

Oceania
 Australia -
 Stephen Smith (2007–2010)
 Kevin Rudd (2010–2012)
 Fiji - Ratu Inoke Kubuabola   (2009–2016)
 French Polynesia - Gaston Tong Sang (2009–2011)
 Kiribati - Anote Tong (2003–2016)
 Marshall Islands - John Silk (2009–2012)
 Micronesia - Lorin S. Robert (2007–2019)
 Nauru - Kieren Keke (2007–2011)
 New Zealand - Murray McCully (2008–2017)
 Cook Islands -
 Jim Marurai (2009–2010)
 Robert Wigmore (2010)
 Tom Marsters (2010–2013)
 Niue - Toke Talagi (2008–2020)
 Tokelau -
 Foua Toloa (2009–2010)
 Kuresa Nasau (2010–2011)
 Palau -
 Sandra Pierantozzi (2009–2010)
 Ramon Rechebei (acting) (2010)
 Victor Yano (2010–2013)
 Papua New Guinea -
 Sam Abal (2007–2010)
 Don Polye (2010–2011)
 Samoa - Tuilaepa Aiono Sailele Malielegaoi (1998–2021)
 Solomon Islands -
 William Haomae (2007–2010)
 Peter Shanel Agovaka (2010–2012)
 Tonga -
 Feleti Sevele (2009–2010)
 Sialeʻataongo Tuʻivakanō (2010–2014)
 Tuvalu -
 Apisai Ielemia (2006–2010)
 Enele Sopoaga (2010)
 Apisai Ielemia (2010–2013)
 Vanuatu -
Joe Natuman (2009–2010)
George Wells (2010-2011)

South America
 Argentina -
 Jorge Taiana (2005–2010)
 Héctor Timerman (2010–2015)
 Bolivia - David Choquehuanca (2006–2017)
 Brazil - Celso Amorim (2003–2011)
 Chile -
 Mariano Fernández Amunátegui (2009–2010)
 Alfredo Moreno Charme (2010–2014)
 Colombia -
 Jaime Bermúdez (2008–2010)
 María Ángela Holguín (2010–2018)
 Ecuador -
 Fander Falconí (2008–2010)
 Lautaro Pozo-Malo (acting) (2010)
 Ricardo Patiño (2010–2016)
 Guyana - Carolyn Rodrigues (2008–2015)
 Paraguay - Héctor Lacognata (2009–2011)
 Peru - José Antonio García Belaúnde (2006–2011)
 Suriname -
 Lygia Kraag-Keteldijk (2005–2010)
 Winston Lackin (2010–2015)
 Uruguay -
 Pedro Vaz (2009–2010)
 Luis Almagro (2010–2015)
 Venezuela - Nicolás Maduro (2006–2013)

References
http://rulers.org

2010 in international relations
Foreign ministers
2010